Mogalirekulu (Telugu: మొగలి రేకులు) was an Indian Telugu language soap opera which originally premiered on 18 February 2008 on Gemini TV and ran until 24 May 2013. It was directed by Manjula Naidu and written by Bindu Naidu. It is one of the longest-running Telugu series. The show starred Sagar, Sheela, Likhitha Kamini, Indraneel and Medha in the lead roles. This is a revenge plot Season 1 focus on Dharma, the eldest of five orphans, looks after the younger ones, Satya, Daya, Santhi and Keerthana, who also want to avenge their parents' death. The story has a lot of twists, drama and touches upon social responsibilities too. Season 2 focuses on their children Mahidhar Naidu/Munna, Devi, Durga, Pallavi, Eshwar and Sindhu.

Synopsis

The story begins with three young boys Dharma, Satya and Daya and their little sister, Shanti. Four of them are the victims of a family feud where their parents and grandmother are murdered by their step grandmother and uncles. They are joined by their neighbor's child Keerthana, who is a victim of a mother's innocent passion for music. They decide to leave for Hyderabad but the things take twists and turns resulting the three brothers and Keerthana was being in Hyderabad and their sister Santi, after separating from her brothers, living with her uncle and step-grandmother.

ACP RK Naidu (who is later the DGP, Mumbai) is a strict, dynamic and responsible IPS officer who marries Shanti after saving her from clutches of her uncle and grandmother. Dharma meets Selva Swamy who indulges in illegal activities which brings the enmity between RK and Selva.

After knowing that Dharma is Santi's brother and many misunderstandings RK come to conclusion that Dharma being an honest friend and sensitive person is just helping his friend Selva in his activities and start adoring him. RK successfully puts the culprits of santi's parents behind the bars as promised to Dharma. A love triangle start confusion among Dharma, Keerthana and Selva (created by Selva's mother where she blackmailed Keerthana to marry Selva for saving Dharma) results in dire enmity of Selva for Dharma and RK where he plans a bomb blast to kill them and the results being death of Daya and Rk and Santi losing their son Mahidhar Naidu.

The serial is into second generation then having Munna, the son of RK Naidu as the hero, who has been orphaned due to the bomb blast who is brought up in a criminal background by a don Sikandar Bhai. Munna falls in love with Devi who is the niece of Selva. Selva feels attached to her as she resemble Selva's wife Meenakshi. Hence he decides to get her married to his elder son Eshwar. Due to some clashes Munna and Eshwar get into heated arguments and fight. But Munna and Devi become friends and her marriage with Eshwar is called off when she reveals her true feelings for munna on the day before wedding, bothering her parents, Eshwar and his grandmother. Munna and Devi get married. Munna plots to attack DGP RK as a part of his criminal life but decides not to because of his good nature and later learns that RK is his father. Munna unable to face his father, hides his identity and changes his name to 'Mahendhra' and starts a health service called AHS to serve rural people and comes back to RK after protecting RK from a bomb blast. While he is away, Devi goes to stay with RK's family by hiding her identity saying that she needs protection until her husband Munna comes back. Meanwhile, RK learns that Munna aka Mahidhar is indeed their son Mahi through Selva Swamy. In Meanwhile, Pallavi and Durga love each other despite their parents' rivalry. RK's family accepts Devi as their daughter-in-law and Devi conceives. The story ends with the two families of RK and Selva uniting by getting Selva's sons married with Dharma and Satya's daughters and also they learn that Dharma is alive.

Cast

References

External links 
 Gemini Tv Official Website
 Gemini Tv on YouTube
 Mogali Rekulu Serial Watch Full Episodes

Telugu-language television shows
2008 Indian television series debuts
2013 Indian television series endings
Gemini TV original programming